Olivier Heck (born 29 June 1966) is a French archer. He competed in the men's individual and team events at the 1988 Summer Olympics.

References

External links
 

1966 births
Living people
French male archers
Olympic archers of France
Archers at the 1988 Summer Olympics
Sportspeople from Pau, Pyrénées-Atlantiques
20th-century French people